Mario Alberto Cámpora (3 August 1930 – 13 January 2022) was an Argentine diplomat. He served as Argentine Ambassador to the United Kingdom from 1990 to 1994 and to Belgium from 1995 to 1999. Cámpora died in Buenos Aires on 13 January 2022, at the age of 91.

He was a nephew of Héctor José Cámpora, a prominent Peronist leader who briefly served as president of Argentina in 1973.

References

1930 births
2022 deaths
Ambassadors of Argentina to Belgium
Ambassadors of Argentina to the United Kingdom
Argentine diplomats
National University of Rosario alumni
People from Mendoza, Argentina